The Blaydon Race is a  athletics race from Newcastle upon Tyne to Blaydon, in England, that is steeped in local tradition. It takes place on 9 June every year and starts off with the singing of the "Blaydon Races" -- with the words as the basis for the race.

History 
The modern race was the inspiration for Dr James Dewar of Blaydon Harriers, who organised the first 24 races starting in 1981. The first race attracted 212 entries, but by 2004 a record of 4,000 people took part with more than 600 other hopefuls rejected.

The 25th anniversary of the race was run by the Blaydon Harriers in 2005 as the "Nike Jim Dewar Blaydon Race" in memory of James Dewar, who died in June 2004 just 2 days after the running of the 24th event.

The task of organising the race was guaranteed by other Blaydon Harrier members and the event's popularity typically means that the entry limit is reached within hours of the race entry forms becoming available.

Charity and sponsorships 
Each year, the event adopts a local Charity - many thousands of pounds have been raised for them each year.

The 2014 and 2015 events were sponsored by the sports retailer Start Fitness.

The 2019 event is sponsored by the global software company Sage Group who have their global headquarters in Newcastle upon Tyne.

Local dialect usage 
In keeping with the local flavour of this race, a lot of the instructions for entering, together with subsequent information mailed to competitors, is written in local Geordie Dialect. Some translations follow:

'Divvent wurri if ya moovin withoot ya legs waakin' : don't worry if you find yourself moving without trying to.

'Gan canny pet' : please take care.

'Wu wivvent charge ye owt extra or tyek any cut from it' : we will pass on to our charity everything you donate.

Past winners

Lads and Lasses

Gadgies and Dames
Gadgie (male over 40) and Dame (female over 35).

References

External links 
 The Blaydon Race

Sport in Newcastle upon Tyne
Sport in Tyne and Wear
Athletics competitions in England
1981 establishments in England
Recurring sporting events established in 1981
Annual sporting events in the United Kingdom
Annual events in England